Geraldine McGowan is a female singer from Dublin, Ireland.

Works (selection)
Somewhere Along The Road
MMR CD 1003 "Reconciliation" on Magnetic Music
MMR CD 1007 "´til the morning comes" on Magnetic Music
MMR CD 1029 "Timeless" on Magnetic Music
GER015 "Through the Years" (2007)

References

External links

http://www.spirited-ireland.net/links/musicians/
https://web.archive.org/web/20110719060133/http://www.magnetic-music.de/artists/geraldinemacgowan.html 

Irish women singers
Living people
Year of birth missing (living people)